The 1953 Ottawa Rough Riders finished in 3rd place in the IRFU with a 7–7 record and failed to qualify for the playoffs.

Preseason

Regular season

Standings

Schedule

References

Ottawa Rough Riders seasons
1953 Canadian football season by team